The 2016 Memorial Cup (branded as the 2016 Mastercard Memorial Cup for sponsorship reasons) was a four-team, round-robin format tournament that took place at the ENMAX Centrium in Red Deer, from May 20–29, 2016. It was the 98th Memorial Cup championship and determined the champion of the Canadian Hockey League (CHL). The tournament was hosted by the Red Deer Rebels, who won the right to host the tournament over a bid by the Vancouver Giants. Other teams participating were the WHL champion Brandon Wheat Kings, the OHL champion London Knights, and the QMJHL champion Rouyn-Noranda Huskies. The tournament ended with the London Knights winning their second Memorial Cup, defeating the Rouyn-Noranda Huskies 3–2 in overtime in the championship final. The Knights won 17 consecutive games to take the title, dating back to the second round of the OHL playoffs.

Red Deer was the first city in Alberta to host since 1974, and the Rebels were therefore the first Albertan host team since the tournament adopted its current format in 1983. All games were televised in Canada on Sportsnet and TVA Sports. The NHL Network televised the games in the United States.

Round-robin standings

Schedule
All times local (UTC −7)

Round robin

Playoff round

Semi-final

Final

Statistical leaders

Skaters

GP = Games played; G = Goals; A = Assists; Pts = Points; PIM = Penalty minutes

Goaltending

This is a combined table of the top goaltenders based on goals against average and save percentage with at least 120 minutes played. The table is sorted by GAA.

GP = Games played; W = Wins; L = Losses; SA = Shots against; GA = Goals against; GAA = Goals against average; SV% = Save percentage; SO = Shutouts; TOI = Time on ice (minutes:seconds)

Awards
 Stafford Smythe Memorial Trophy (MVP): Mitch Marner, London Knights
 Ed Chynoweth Trophy (Leading Scorer): Mitch Marner, London Knights
 George Parsons Trophy (Sportsmanlike): Francis Perron, Rouyn-Noranda Huskies
 Hap Emms Memorial Trophy (Top Goalie): Tyler Parsons, London Knights
 All-Star Team:
Goaltender: Tyler Parsons, London Knights
Defence: Olli Juolevi, London Knights; Haydn Fleury, Red Deer Rebels
Forwards: Christian Dvorak, London Knights; Mitch Marner, London Knights; Timo Meier, Rouyn-Noranda Huskies

Rosters

Red Deer Rebels (Host)
Head coach: Brent Sutter

Brandon Wheat Kings (WHL)
 Head coach: Kelly McCrimmon

Rouyn-Noranda Huskies (QMJHL)
 Head coach: Gilles Bouchard

London Knights (OHL)
 Head coach: Dale Hunter

Road to the Cup

WHL Playoffs

OHL Playoffs

QMJHL Playoffs

References

External links
 Memorial Cup
 Canadian Hockey League

Memorial Cup tournaments
Memorial Cup
Memorial Cup